Laura Gerraughty (born July 29, 1983 in Nashua, New Hampshire) is an American former shot putter.

Laura began throwing as a sophomore in high school in her hometown of Nashua, New Hampshire.  She went on to represent the University of North Carolina at Chapel Hill in the shot, discus, hammer, and weight throws under event coach Brian Blutreich and head coach Dennis Craddock.  Gerraughty holds school records in each of these events.  She holds a combined 13 Atlantic Coast Conference Championships individual event titles in these events, as well as 10 NCAA Division I All-America honors.

She finished fourth at the 2000 World Junior Championships in Santiago, Chile and won the bronze medal at the 2002 World Junior Championships in Kingston, Jamaica. She then competed at the 2004 Olympic Games without reaching the final round.

Her personal best throw is 19.15 metres, achieved in March 2004 at the NCAA Division I Indoor Track & Field Championships.  This is the farthest throw by any NCAA Division I female shot putter, indoors or outdoors.  In that same year, Laura also won the NCAA Division I Outdoor Track & Field Championships, the USA Track & Field Indoor National Championships, and the USA Track & Field Outdoor National Championships (the 2004 U.S. Olympic Trials).

Following her collegiate career, Laura competed briefly for Nike, Inc., representing the company at the 2005 USA Track & Field Outdoor National Championships.  Her career was later ended due to injury.  She went on to coach the throws for her alma mater for two seasons.

Laura Gerraughty, now Laura Ekstrand, lives with her family in Tyngsborough, Massachusetts.

International competitions

References
 

1983 births
Living people
Sportspeople from Nashua, New Hampshire
American female shot putters
Olympic track and field athletes of the United States
Athletes (track and field) at the 2004 Summer Olympics
Pan American Games track and field athletes for the United States
Athletes (track and field) at the 2003 Pan American Games
People from Tyngsborough, Massachusetts
Sportspeople from Middlesex County, Massachusetts
21st-century American women